Hutchinson USD 308 is a public unified school district headquartered in Hutchinson, Kansas, United States.  The district includes most of the city of Hutchinson.

Schools
The school district operates the following schools:
 Hutchinson High School
 Hutchinson Middle School 7
 Hutchinson Middle School 8
 Allen Grade School
 Avenue A Grade School
 Faris Elementary School
 Graber Elementary School
 Lincoln Elementary School
 McCandless Elementary School
 Morgan Elementary School
 Wiley Elementary School

See also
 Kansas State Department of Education
 Kansas State High School Activities Association
 List of high schools in Kansas
 List of unified school districts in Kansas

References

External links
 

School districts in Kansas
Education in Reno County, Kansas